The Grey Coat Hospital is a Church of England secondary school with academy status for girls in Westminster, London, England.  It is a specialist Language College.

History
The school was formally established at the Trustees' first meeting held on St. Andrew's Day in 1698. Eight members of the congregation of St. Margaret's, Westminster donated towards the founding of the school, initially a day school for 50 boys.

Its founding trustees were Robert Maddock, a cheesemonger, John Holmes, a "sope" and candles maker, Thomas Wisdome, a tradesman in leather goods and brooms, Samuel Mitchell, a bookseller, Richard Ffyler, a draper, Charles Webbe, John Wilkins and Simon Boult who "contributed towards the Charges of the School on their own, and subscriptions provided from other substantial persons".

They aimed to educate "40 of the Greatest Objects of Charity (orphans and neglected children) in the principles of the Christian religion, teaching reading and instructing them in the Church catechism, the discipline of the Church of England as by law established, and for teaching writing and cast accounts" and "binding them apprentices to honest trades and employments".

The School opened with only 11 boys. Its first Headmaster was Thomas Ashenden, on a yearly salary of £26.

The school, which opened on 9 January 1698, was initially housed by the "Broad Sanctuary" in front of Westminster Abbey.

Soon, the opportunity arose to take over the old workhouse in "Tuttle-Fields" which had been founded in accordance with the first Poor Law of Queen Elisabeth I in 1601, and which had moved out in 1700.

18th century 
The first annual rent for the hospital and all the adjoining ground, all owned by Westminster Abbey, was £5 10s, and the school came into the residence where its principal building is today on 6 January 1701. From that year it was also a mixed school, with both boys and girls attending. The founders' aim was to provide the poor of the parish with an education, so that they could become loyal citizens, useful workers and solid Christians.

Soon, other benefactors signed up, including Mr Charles Rampayne, Mr Lionel Herne (an original member of the Society for Promoting Christian Knowledge), Mr Justice Thomas Railton, Madam Mary Bryan, Madam Delahay, Hon. Anne Napier and Lady Mary Carnavon.

Other early benefactors were the Right Hon. James Vernon, later Secretary of State for War, his son James, Samuel Bray, Justice John Chamberlayne (an S.P.C.K. founder), Dr George Smallridge, Dean of Christchurch and later Bishop of Bristol, Dr John Sharp, Dean of Christ Church and Archbishop of York, Lady Jane Hyde and the orator and sermons author Robert South.

The first staff of the school consisted of the Headmaster Mr Ashenden and his wife, two spinsters, Mrs Gotobed and Goody Corbet, two nurses and Israel Thomas. By May 1706, the school received Queen Anne's Charter, an act of incorporation which allowed it to formally hold houses, land, grant leases, etc., and which also meant it had to formalize a board. Thus, Queen Anne's Charter was read on the 26 May 1706, in the presence of a board consisting of three esquires (including two Justices of the Peace), five brewers and fifteen tradesmen, who elected as the school's first President, John Moore, Bishop of Norwich. It was also for this very occasion that the school's seal of “The Royal Foundation of Queen Anne in the Parish of St. Margaret’s Westminster”, as the school was titled, was created, agreed among several proposals by the majority, with a figure of one planting and another watering, with the motto of "God giveth the increase". The school's popular name became "The Grey Coat Hospital" after the colour of the clothes provided for the children.

In 1710, the Archbishop of York, the aforementioned Dr Sharp, succeeded as second President of the school and tried to follow up on an earlier petition by the Bishop of Bristol Dr Smallridge to Queen Anne for funds, but to no avail, despite her request that the school take in two girls who had been orphaned due to the War of Spanish Succession.

On the occasion of a Thanksgiving Service at St Paul's Cathedral after the signing of the Treaty of Utrecht, however, the Queen invited the school's children (including the two orphaned girls) to watch the procession on seats erected for them on Fleet Street over against Somerset House. Orders were given for the children to have "small beer and bread and cheese before they started, and buttock of beef and strong beer on their return." Beer, wrote Headmistress Elsie Sarah Day in her history of Grey Coat Hospital School published in 1902, was the only drink provided for the children, for breakfast and supper as well as dinner until the reign of Queen Victoria, when milk and water replaced it, except at dinner.

From 1785, 60 boys and 30 girls were admitted. The girls were taught needlework trades and were mostly placed in domestic service. The boys were employed in a variety of occupations, and a number went to sea, either apprenticed to naval officers or to the trading companies. For this purpose, they were taught mathematical skills, including the art of navigation. Selected Grey Coat Hospital boys attended a mathematical school in Covent Garden for three days a week. A mathematical master was appointed to the staff in 1739. One of the boys benefitting from this education was David Thompson, who was admitted in 1777. In 1784 he was apprenticed to the Hudson’s Bay Company for seven years and became a famous explorer. During the late eighteenth century, a study of the school's archives in its first two centuries by Elsie Sarah Day reveals that the management of the school deteriorated and on a number of occasions pupils tried to escape the tyranny of the dishonest and incapable masters and mistresses.

19th century 
Between 1870 and 1873, a weary struggle pitched the Governors of the Grey Coat Hospital School, resisting change and arguing for independence, and the Endowment Schools Commission, established by the Education Department, also then housed at 31, Abingdon Street. Eventually, the Governors relented, and the Charities Commissioner for the large Westminster Endowments, including Grey Coat Hospital, Palmer's Hospital, Emery Hill's Hospital and Emanuel Hospital, resolved that the school would become an establishment for girls only. It was agreed that, provisions being made for the boys under other trusts, it was deemed appropriate to intend the Grey Coat Endowments to girls only. In March 1873, a newly constituted body of Governors, chaired by the civil engineer Henry Arthur Hunt undertook to carry out the scheme of the Endowment Schools Commission. One of its first duties was to arrange for the boys: some were received at Emanuel School, then in Westminster, whose girls took their place in the Grey Coat Hospital, and others went to Ashford, then the Welsh School, later also a girls school and today St David's. As a result, in 1874, when the then 25-year-old Elsie Sarah Day joined, she became the first headmistress of what had become the only girls' school under church management.

The Governors had pledged to establish a girls' boarding school, so in early in 1894 they purchased Amersham Hall, near Reading, which had been a non-conformist boarding school for boys. It relocated in 1861 to Caversham in Oxfordshire, a suburb in the north of Reading and now in Berkshire, and which currently houses Queen Anne's School. It opened in May 1894 with 39 girls and is still connected with The Grey Coat Hospital though the shared oversight of the United Westminster & Grey Coat Foundation.

In the first two centuries of its history, Grey Coat Hospital School's charity has had many distinguished benefactors and subscribers, including Lord Hardwicke, Lord Robert Henley (afterwards Earl of Northington), George Granville (afterwards Marquis of Buckingham), the philosopher Jeremy Bentham, Henry Pelham-Clinton and his wife Lady Susan, the Earl and Countess of Lincoln (afterwards Duke and Duchess of Newcastle), Mr Stephen Hoare, Dr Richard Jebb (later Sir), the Earl Richard Temple (Duke of Buckingham and Chandos), the Lord Chief Justice Sir John Pratt (afterwards Marquis Camden), Lord Edward Thurlow, 1st Baron Thurlow, Henry Bathurst (Lord Aspley), Robert Grosvenor (Viscount Belgrave, afterwards Earl Grosvenor, Mr Speaker Henry Addington (afterwards Viscount Sidmouth), Lord Bathurst, Mr Speaker Charles Abbott (afterwards Lord Colchester), Spencer Perceval M P (later prime minister), the Earl of Moire, Francis Edward Rawdon (later Marquess of Hastings), Baroness Angela Burdett-Coutts, Lady Lucy Cavendish, a pioneer of women's education, and Lady Harriett Burrell. Many bishops have been Governors or Subscribers, among whom Dr William Markham of York, Dr John Hinchliffe of Peterborough, Dr John Butler of Oxford, Dr John Warren of St. David's, Dr Samuel Hallifax of Gloucester, Dr Beilby Porteus of London, Dr Edward Smallwell of Oxford, Dr Samuel Horsley of Rochester.

Apart from the two cited above, other Presidents are the Archbishops of Canterbury, Dr Thomas Secker, Dr Frederick Cornwallis and Dr Charles Manners-Sutton. Notable Governors are to be found in an unbroken line of archbishops of Canterbury and Deans of Westminster, including Samuel Wilberforce. In law and political life they also included men such as the aforesaid Right Hon. Spencer Percival, the Vice Chancellor Sir William Page Wood (or Lord Hatherley), and the Right Hon. John Charles Herries, Chancellor of the Exchequer.

20th century 
Until 1894 The Grey Coat Hospital had been self-supporting through its endowments and termly fees. That year grants in aid were received from the London County Council for LCC scholars.

In 1908, the school was placed on the grant list of the Board of Education and, in 1920, became an LCC assisted school, without relinquishing any of its distinctive characters.

During World War II, the school was evacuated twice, first to Brighton, then to Farnham, Surrey. While unoccupied, the old seventeenth-century building was almost destroyed during an air raid on the night of 10–11 May 1941. After the war, the school continued in temporary accommodation while rebuilding took place.

The provisions of the 1944 Education Act meant the end of the Grey Coat Hospital’s preparatory department after almost 250 years, and the school became entirely non-fee paying. Seven years later the school became voluntary aided.

In July 1955, the school moved back into new buildings on its original seventeenth century site, with a restored original façade, and was opened by Princess Alexandra.

In 1977, the Grey Coat Hospital amalgamated with St Michael's, a Church of England secondary school in Chester Square near Pimlico Police Station to become a comprehensive school. In 1998, the Grey Coat Hospital celebrated its tercentenary by opening a new building for the Upper School on Regency Street, replacing an older site on Sloane Square. The St Michael's building was inaugurated by the Queen. The original building is still used primarily by years 7–9 (Lower School), while years 10–11 and the sixth form are based at the St Michael's building, although most pupils visit both sites regularly.

21st century

In 2009 construction began on a new arts block at Lower School under the Building Schools for the Future programme. The school became a Language College in 2002, and in 2008 was also granted the status of Training School. The school encourages all students to take part in a language exchange, usually in Years 9 or 10, and has partnered with schools in Münster in Germany and Pamplona, Spain, along with a long-established link with two secondary schools in Tokyo, offering the opportunity for six girls in Year 10 to spend 10 days in Japan. In its most recent inspection report in 2009, Ofsted again assessed the school as "outstanding".

In early 2015 the school came to the attention of the press when it became known that Prime Minister David Cameron was enrolling his daughter to the school. At the time, Michael Gove, who had been Secretary of State for Education from 2010 to 2014, and his wife, journalist Sarah Vine, had already had their daughter enrolled since the previous year.

On 24 November 2020, a year 12 student, Christina Adane, was chosen as one of The BBC 100 Women of 2020, the broadcaster's list of 100 most inspiring and influential women from around the world for 2020. Adane was behind the UK petition for free school meals over the summer holidays, which footballer Marcus Rashford supported. As the youth board co-chairwoman of Bite Back 2030, a campaign to fight injustice in the food industry – and having received free school meals herself – Adane  campaigned to make sure no child in the UK goes hungry.

Governance
The current head teacher is Susanne Staab, who succeeded Siân Maddrell in late 2019. In turn, Maddrell had succeeded Rachel Allard in April 2011.

The school became an academy on 1 July 2012.

The current Grey Coat Foundation Governors are: ex officio, i.e. appointed by the Dean and Chapter of The Collegiate Church of St. Peter Westminster, the Reverend Canon Dr. J Hawkey. Appointed by the London Diocesan Board for Schools, Ms N. S. Cottier. Appointed by the Trustees, Miss E. M. Gibson, Mr. John Oliver Nesbitt, Mrs Jackie Schroer, Mr. F. S. Schulenburg, Mr. Slater, Mrs R.N. Stewart. The non-Foundation Governors are, Mr. R. D. Clark (Acting Chair), Mrs C. E. Acraman (Teaching Staff Governor), Mrs P. Swan (Support Staff Governor), Dr. M. Hetherington (Paeds), Dr. G.A. Thomas (Elected Parent Governor).

The Grey Coat Foundation 
The Grey Coat Foundation itself, however, is governed by the United Westminster & Grey Coat Foundation which at the end of March 2019 formally merged. The United Westminster Schools’ Foundation springs from the union in 1873 of four ancient foundations: Emanuel Hospital, founded in 1594 by Lady Dacre, St. Margaret’s Hospital founded in 1633 by King Charles I; Palmer’s School, founded by the Reverend James Palmer in 1650; and Hill’s Grammar School, founded by Emery Hill in 1708. Originally, Emanuel Hospital pupils wore brown coats, those of St. Margaret’s Hospital wore a green coats. The pupils of Palmer's School wore black, as the name of the school, the precursor to Westminster City, was from 1671 called the Black Coat School. The parish of St. Margaret Westminster also had a Blue Coat School (closed 1898), whose building can still be seen in Caxton Street. The charters and foundations of the above cited charity schools were by Act of Parliament in 1873 incorporated into the Grey Coat Hospital Foundation and United Westminster Schools Foundation, which now combined encompasses five schools, including two state academies (both comprehensive) and three independent. Its office is based in Westminster City School, providing among other things, a secretariat for Trustees and Governors, as well as advice to the schools and Trustees on legal, financial. The five schools under the foundation, aside from The Grey Coat Hospital, are Westminster City School, Emanuel School in Battersea, Sutton Valence School in Maidstone (handed over in 1910 The Worshipful Company of Clothworkers), and Queen Anne's School in Caversham. Within a strategy promoting the public benefit, its declared mission is building upon a strong history and excellent record of educational achievement, to strengthen this provision in both the state and independent sector in a mutually supportive and collaborative environment for of the Foundation’s pupils. Its aim is to promote broadly based educational excellence and improvement, which is financially sustainable, in each of the Foundation’s high performing schools, and to do so within the framework of a Christian ethos.

School behaviour code
The school has a strict behaviour code, summarised for students as "The most important rule of all is to behave well at all times inside and outside the school, in a way which will bring honour to it, credit to you and that will show courtesy and consideration for other people."

The school suspended 29 students in December 2008 for joining an open Facebook group described by the Head as "a hate campaign against a member of staff". Westminster City Council supported the school's decision. Teaching unions said that one in five teachers faces cyber-bullying, and called for expulsions in serious cases. Although the Facebook group was removed, discussions remained on another website with disparaging comments about the teacher concerned. The Daily Telegraph reported that some pupils had contacted the paper to say that the school had gone too far.

Notable former pupils
In 2007, Ray Mears visited the school to unveil a new plaque for notable former pupil David Thompson, the explorer responsible for charting much of North America. David Thompson was admitted in 1777 and apprenticed to the Hudson’s Bay Company for seven years in 1784, and had a river in the Rocky Mountains named after him in recognition of his contribution to the mapping of Western Canada. More recently he was commemorated on a Canadian postage stamp. One of David Thompson’s contemporaries and pupils of the school was John Hatchard, founder in 1797 of the oldest bookshop in England, still operating in Piccadilly. Another interesting association of the school was Ho Chi Minh, the founder of modern Vietnam, who was a labourer at the hospital in 1913, whilst a student in London. Another notable Old Grey was the actress and artist's model Eleanor Thornton, who has been immortalised in the Rolls-Royce Spirit of Ecstasy mascot since 1911.

Notable former pupils of recent times include:
 Phyllis Agbo (born 1985), British heptathlete, represented England at the 2010 Commonwealth Games
 Abby Rakic-Platt (born 1993), actress
 Ebony-Jewel Rainford-Brent (born 1983), cricketer (the first black woman to play for the England team)

Grammar school
 Ann Felicity Goddard (1936–2011), Judge
 Tamsin Dunwoody (born 1958), Labour politician
 Sarah Greene (born 1958), TV presenter
 Ruth Langsford (born 1960), has presented This Morning since 2006 with her husband Eamonn Holmes
 Prof Linda Newson FBA (born 1946), Professor of Geography since 1994 at King's College London, and Director since 2012 of the Institute of Latin American Studies, and winner of the RGS Back Award in 1993
 Prof Jean Seaton (born 1947), Official Historian of the BBC since 2003, and Director since 2007 of the Orwell Prize
 Lowri Turner (born 1964), fashion journalist and television presenter
 Sally Vincent (1937–2013), Guardian journalist
 Katherine Weare (born 1950), Professor of Education
 Heather Wheeler (born 1959), Conservative MP since 2010 for South Derbyshire, and Leader from 2007 to 2010 of South Derbyshire District Council
Kamanza Amihyia (born 1972), British Beauty Council Advisory Board Member, Celebrity Make Up artist for Stevie Wonder and has worked on multiple BBC and Netflix Productions

Former teachers
 Fiona Booth, Chief Executive since 2013 of the Association of Independent Healthcare Organisations, and from 2007 to 2012 of the Hansard Society (taught science from 2000 to 2001)
 Margaret Laird OBE, Third Church Estates Commissioner from 1988 to 1999 (taught divinity from 1955 to 1959)

Buildings
Situated on Greycoat Place, the main building's brown brick three-storey centre block with stuccoed centrepiece dates to 1701, restored and extended in 1955 with wings by architect Laurence King after war damage. The entrance is Doric columned and pedimented with triglyph entablature. Above are two niches containing painted wooden figures of charity children, a girl and a boy in school uniform, probably early 18th century, flanking the (new, post-1707 Acts of Union with Scotland) arms of Queen Anne, with her 1702 motto Semper eadem ("always the same"), moulded in Coade stone. The main building was first listed in 1970, and again under the Planning (Listed Buildings and Conservation Areas) Act 1990 as amended for its special architectural or historic interest. In 1998, the school added a new building, St Michael's, for the Upper School, on Regency Street, which also has a frontage on Douglas Street.

Film location
The 2006 film version of Stormbreaker used the building as Alex Rider's school.

References

External links
 
  http://westminstergreycoat.org/
 Department for Children, Schools and Families – EduBase2
An old Westminster endowment : being a history of the Grey Coat Hospital as recorded in the minute books, by Elsie Sarah Day (Head Mistress)

Secondary schools in the City of Westminster
Girls' schools in London
1698 establishments in England
Educational institutions established in the 1690s
Church of England secondary schools in the Diocese of London
Academies in the City of Westminster
Training schools in England
Specialist language colleges in England
Victoria, London